Jesse Norris is a former a US elite powerlifter. He holds multiple world records in the 198lb weight class.

Powerlifting achievements 
766 lb(348 kg) Squat at 198 lbs (89,8 kg)

441 lb(200 kg) Bench Press at 198 lbs

821 lb(373 kg) Deadlift at 198 lbs

2,033 lb(924 kg) Total at 198 lbs(All Time World Record)

One of very few lifters to achieve a ten times bodyweight total.

The Start of Powerlifting 
Norris had an athletic background prior to powerlifting including both football and track and field. He started competing in the sport of powerlifting at the age of 14, with his training beginning in his 8th grade year. He was a football player in high school and states that as being his reason for getting involved in powerlifting and fitness. His brother was a football all star, but Jesse was not chosen to start on the team. He started training in order to improve himself as an athlete.

References 

 

Living people
American powerlifters
American bodybuilders
Year of birth missing (living people)